Alkaline water electrolysis is a type of electrolyzer that is characterized by having two electrodes operating in a liquid alkaline electrolyte solution of potassium hydroxide (KOH) or sodium hydroxide (NaOH).  These electrodes are separated by a diaphragm, separating the product gases and transporting the hydroxide ions  (OH−) from one electrode to the other. A recent comparison showed that state-of-the-art nickel based water electrolyzers with alkaline electrolytes lead to competitive or even better efficiencies than acidic polymer electrolyte membrane water electrolysis with platinum group metal based electrocatalysts.

The technology has a long history in the chemical industry. The first large-scale demand for hydrogen emerged in late 19th century for lighter-than-air aircraft, and before the advent of steam reforming in the 1930s, the technique was competitive.

In the context of decarbonisation of industry alkaline water electrolysis can be regarded as an important technology enabling efficient energy conversion and storage.

Structure and materials
The electrodes are typically separated by a thin porous foil (with a thickness between 0.050 to 0.5 mm), commonly referred to as diaphragm or separator. The diaphragm is non-conductive to electrons, thus avoiding electrical shorts between the electrodes while allowing small distances between the electrodes. The ionic conductivity is supplied by the aqueous alkaline solution, which penetrates in the pores of the diaphragm. The state-of-the-art diaphragm is Zirfon, a composite material of zirconia and Polysulfone.
The diaphragm further avoids the mixing of the produced hydrogen and oxygen at the cathode and anode, respectively. 

Typically, Nickel based metals are used as the electrodes for alkaline water electrolysis.  Considering pure metals, Ni is the least active non-noble metal. The high price of good noble metal electrocatalysts such as platinum group metals and their dissolution during the oxygen evolution is a drawback. Ni is considered as more stable during the oxygen evolution, but stainless steel has shown good stability and better catalytic activity than Ni at high temperatures during the Oxygen Evolution Reaction (OER).

High surface area Ni catalysts can be achieved by dealloying of Nickel-Zinc or Nickel-Aluminium alloys in alkaline solution, commonly referred to as Raney nickel. In cell tests the best performing electrodes thus far reported consisted of plasma vacuum sprayed Ni alloys on Ni meshes

and hot dip galvanized Ni meshes. The latter approach might be interesting for large scale industrial manufacturing as it is cheap and easily scalable.

Advantages compared to PEM water electrolysis
In comparison to polymer electrolyte water electrolysis, the advantages of alkaline water electrolysis are mainly: 

 Cheaper catalysts with respect to the platinum metal group based catalysts used for PEM water electrolysis. 
 Higher durability due to an exchangeable electrolyte and lower dissolution of anodic catalyst. 
 Higher gas purity due to lower gas diffusivity in alkaline electrolyte.

References

Chemical processes
Electrochemistry
Electrolysis
Industrial gases
Hydrogen production